The  was the fourteenth season of the Japan Football League, the third tier of the Japanese football league system. It has started on March 11, and finished on November 18.

Clubs

The league intended to run the season in the usual 18-team format, but after the withdrawal of Arte Takasaki in January no replacement team was invited so in 2012 JFL features only 17 teams.

Subsequently, only one club will be directly relegated and one take part in pro/rele playoffs to bring the number of JFL clubs back to 18.

During the season, on 23 July, Nagano Parceiro were approved as J. League associate members, though they are not eligible for promotion until the completion of the renovation of their home stadium which is expected in 2016.

On 28 September 2012, J. League Organization made an announcement for club licenses for 2013, and only Nagasaki was granted conditional J2 license.

On 16 October 2012, it was reported that Sagawa Shiga F.C. had notified JFL organization about their intention of withdrawal from JFL as of the end of this season. On 17 October 2012, JFL Committee has approved the request from Sagawa Shiga F.C. for its withdrawal from JFL as of the end of the season.

Change in rules

Promotions to J. League Division 2

Relegation to regional leagues
Because of withdrawals by Arte Takasaki and Sagawa Shiga, no clubs will be relegated automatically as of the end of the season. The bottom finished (17th placed) club will play a play-off against the 3rd placed club of the 2012 Regional League promotion series.

Table

Results

Top scorers

Updated to games played on 18 November 2012
Source: Japan Football League

Attendance

Promotions and relegations after the regular season
V-Varen Nagasaki were automatically promoted to J2 while Machida Zelvia became the first ever team to be relegated from J. League, returning to the JFL after only one season.

SC Sagamihara and Fukushima United were promoted to JFL as the winner and runner-up of the Regional League promotion series, respectively. Third-placed Norbritz Hokkaido faced Tochigi Uva in a playoff series. Both games were played in Tochigi to prevent snow in Hokkaido from potentially postponing an away game. After two games, the series were tied 2–2, but Tochigi Uva won the penalty shootout 4–1, retaining their spot in JFL for the 2013 season.

Playoffs with Regional Promotion Series

Tochigi Uva won the series 4–1 on penalty kicks and remained in JFL.

References

External links
Official site

2012
3